Anophthalmia megalocornea cardiopathy skeletal anomalies syndrome is an extremely rare multi-systemic genetic disorder which is characterized by congenital ocular, muscular, and heart abnormalities. It was first described in the children of a consanguineous couple, and it is thought to be autosomal recessive disorder with variable expressity. No new cases have been described in medical literature since 1992.


Presentation 

People with this disorder usually have the following symptoms: dolichocephaly, asymmetrical skull, camptodactyly, talipes equinovarus, muscular hypoplasia, anophthalmia, buphthalmos, retinal detachment, aniridia, tricuspid valve prolapse, and mitral and tricuspid deficiency.

Diagnosis

References 

Rare genetic syndromes
Syndromes with musculoskeletal abnormalities
Syndromes affecting the heart
Syndromes affecting the retina